Josiah Power is a fictional superhero published by DC Comics. He first appeared in JLA #61 (February 2002), but his origin is told in Power Company: Josiah Power #1 (March 2002). Josiah was created by Kurt Busiek and Tom Grummett.

Fictional character biography

The impressively tall, craggy featured Josiah Power was one of America's best lawyers until his metagene was triggered during the alien invasion by the activation of the Gene Bomb.

Following the untimely public activation of his metagene in the court room, corporate attorney Josiah Power was dismissed from his law firm. Power had little interest in becoming a traditional costumed hero, but it became readily apparent that he could not continue to practice law without undue public attention.

Power Company

Working his way through a short depression and other problems, Josiah eventually found a way to combine his old skills and newfound abilities. He decided to found a business of superheroes for hire, structured like a law firm, with partners and associates.

He called his new team the Power Company. During his tenure in the team, he was put into a coma from a gunshot wound and Firestorm became an associate. He has since recovered and has continued active duty. He rarely participates in the company's missions. He has made exceptions but only when the situation was dire. Josiah lives with his life partner Rupert.

Justice League
Josiah and the rest of the Power Company are injured during a battle with Doctor Impossible and a group of villains using technology from New Genesis. Josiah was found near death, but was saved by a timely intervention from Mon-El. During a later discussion, Hal Jordan worriedly remarks that if the villains were able to defeat someone as powerful as Josiah, then the members of the Justice League are going to have a big problem on their hands.

Powers and abilities
When he activates his powers Josiah transforms into a monstrous, grey, stone-like seven-foot giant, and an energy corona begins to spark about his body. He gains great strength, invulnerability and possibly other energy-based powers. At one point, after seeing him in action, Superman stated that Josiah was one of the most powerful superhumans he had ever met.

References

External links
Josiah Power at DCU Guide
Josiah Power at Gay League
Cosmic Teams: Power Company Chronology at mykey3000.com

Fictional African-American people
Fictional lawyers
Fictional gay males
DC Comics characters with superhuman strength
DC Comics LGBT superheroes
DC Comics metahumans
Characters created by Kurt Busiek